PA434 may refer to:
 Philippine Airlines Flight 434
 Pennsylvania Route 434